The 2009 Gran Turismo D1 Grand Prix series was the ninth season for the D1 Grand Prix series and the fourth for the D1 Street Legal spinoff series. This year saw the return of the US series after its cancellation last year, its second season. The series began on March 29, 2009 at Ebisu Circuit for the D1GP and April 11 for D1SL at Bihoku Highland Circuit. The USA series consisted of four rounds and the first round was on May 2, 2009. The series concluded on December 5 as a D1SL point scoring round. Youichi Imamura took advantage of a non-score by Tsuyoshi Tezuka at the final round to claim the D1GP title in his Nissan Silvia. Meanwhile, in D1SL, Naoki Nakamura claimed that championship, also in a Silvia.

Schedule

Results

Round 1

Round 2

Round 3

Round 4

Round 5

Round 6

Round 7

Round 8

Final Championship Results

D1GP

D1SL

External links
 D1GP
D1 Grand Prix USA

D1 Grand Prix seasons
D1 Grand Prix
2009 in Japanese motorsport